Chris Simms (born 1980) is a former American football quarterback.

Chris Simms may also refer to:
 Chris Simms (author) (born 1969), British author
 Chris Simms (musician) in Skunkhour
 Chris Simms, founder of Lazy Dog Cafe

See also
 Chris Sims (disambiguation)